Jules G. Sabbatino (October 19, 1911 – January 6, 1999) was an American politician who served in the New York State Assembly from 1959 to 1970.

References

1911 births
1999 deaths
Democratic Party members of the New York State Assembly
20th-century American politicians